The Deep-dose equivalent  (DDE) is a measure of external radiation exposure defined by US regulations. It is reported alongside eye and shallow dose equivalents on typical US dosimetry reports. It represents the dose equivalent at a tissue depth of 1 cm (1000 mg/cm2) due to external whole-body exposure to ionizing radiation.

Dose due to external radiation tends to decrease with depth because of the shielding effects of outer tissues. The reference depth of 1 cm essentially discounts alpha and beta radiation that are easily shielded by the skin, clothing, and bone surface, while taking minimal credit for any self-shielding from the more penetrating gamma rays. This makes the deep-dose equivalent a conservative measure of internal organ exposure to external radiation, while eye and skin exposure to external radiation must be accounted differently. Deep-dose equivalent does include any contribution from internal contamination.

See also

Radioactivity
Radiation poisoning
Ionizing radiation
Dosimetry
Absorbed dose
Total effective dose equivalent
Collective dose
Cumulative dose
Committed dose equivalent
Committed effective dose equivalent

References

USNRC glossary

External links
  - "The confusing world of radiation dosimetry" - M.A. Boyd, 2009, U.S. Environmental Protection Agency. An account of chronological differences between USA and ICRP dosimetry systems.

Radioactivity
Radiation health effects
Equivalent units